Stefan Due Schmidt (born 28 August 1994) is a speed skater from Copenhagen. He had been an inline speed skater before switching to ice. He competed for Denmark at the 2018 Winter Olympics.

References

External links 

 

1994 births
Danish male speed skaters
Speed skaters at the 2018 Winter Olympics
Speed skaters at the 2022 Winter Olympics
Olympic speed skaters of Denmark
Sportspeople from Copenhagen
Living people